Le nuove comiche is a 1994 Italian comedy film directed by Neri Parenti.

It is the third and final installment in the Comiche trilogy, preceded by Le comiche (1990) and Le comiche 2 (1991).

Cast

References

External links

1994 films
Films directed by Neri Parenti
Films scored by Bruno Zambrini
1990s Italian-language films
1994 comedy films
Italian comedy films
1990s Italian films